José de Souza (born 22 January 1963) is a Beninese hurdler. He competed in the men's 110 metres hurdles at the 1988 Summer Olympics.

References

1963 births
Living people
Athletes (track and field) at the 1988 Summer Olympics
Beninese male hurdlers
Olympic athletes of Benin
Place of birth missing (living people)